Flavobacterium endophyticum is a Gram-negative, aerobic and rod-shaped bacterium from the genus of Flavobacterium which has been isolated from the tissue of a maize plant from Beijing in China.

References

endophyticum
Bacteria described in 2015